Robert de Clifford, 3rd Baron de Clifford, also 3rd Lord of Skipton (5 November 1305 – 20 May 1344) was a member of the Clifford family which held the seat of Skipton from 1310 to 1676. He was the second son of Robert de Clifford, 1st Baron de Clifford and Maud de Clare, eldest daughter of Thomas de Clare, Lord of Thomond and Juliana FitzGerald. His title was restored to him in 1327 after being forfeited by his elder brother Roger de Clifford, 2nd Baron de Clifford who was hanged for treason.

He married Isabel, daughter of Maurice de Berkeley, 2nd Baron Berkeley at Berkeley Castle in 1328. They had 7 children. He was succeeded as Baron De Clifford by the eldest son, Robert de Clifford, 4th Baron de Clifford.

References

1305 births
1344 deaths
14th-century English nobility
High Sheriffs of Westmorland
Robert
Barons de Clifford